Giorgos Dimitrakopoulos (Greek: Γιώργος Δημητρακόπουλος) (born 18 September 1952, in Athens) is a Greek politician and Member of the European Parliament for New Democracy ; part of the European People's Party.

Background 
Graduate of the Legal Faculty of the University of Athens (Public Law and Political Science Department) (1972–1976): postgraduate studies (Master of Arts) in International Affairs at the American University (Washington, 1977–1979); postgraduate studies in international law and diplomatic history at the Fletcher School of Law and Diplomacy (Boston, 1979–1981).

Political career 
Political affairs adviser in the Prime Minister's Diplomatic Office (1983–1986). Political affairs adviser in the Foreign Ministers' Diplomatic Office (1986–1989). Member of the European Parliament (from 1994). First Vice-Chairman of the Committees on Petitions and Citizens rights (1994–1999). Chairman of the Delegation for relations with Switzerland, Iceland and Norway (1999–2000). Second Vice-President of the European Parliament (2002–2004). Chairman of the Conciliation Committee (2000–2004). Responsible for Euro-Mediterranean cooperation.

Other appointments 
Press and communications attaché at the Greek Embassy in Washington, USA (1977–1979). Diplomatic history researcher at the Fletcher School of Law and Diplomacy, Boston, USA (1979–1981). Visiting professor at the Greek Ministry of Foreign Affairs Institute of Diplomacy (Athens, 1983–1988).

References

External links
 
 MEP Giorgos Dimitrakopoulos discusses Gas and energy crisis between the European Union, Ukraine and Russia, January 2009, ISRIA

1952 births
Living people
Politicians from Athens
New Democracy (Greece) MEPs
MEPs for Greece 1994–1999
MEPs for Greece 1999–2004
MEPs for Greece 2004–2009
The Fletcher School at Tufts University alumni
National and Kapodistrian University of Athens alumni